PSG Talon is a professional League of Legends team formed from a partnership between PSG Esports and Talon Esports. Talon Esports' original League of Legends team was founded on 18 December 2019.

PSG Talon competes in the Pacific Championship Series (PCS), the top-level of professional League of Legends in Taiwan, Hong Kong, Macau, Southeast Asia, and Oceania. It is the most successful team in the PCS, having won four of the league's six titles and having qualified for the World Championship twice, in 2020 and 2021.

History

Founding 
Riot Games announced on 19 December 2019 that Talon Esports would be one of ten teams participating in the newly created Pacific Championship Series. Talon Esports' first player was announced on 1 January, with top laner Su "Hanabi" Chia-hsiang joining from Flash Wolves. During the next few days the rest of the roster was announced: South Korean players Kim "River" Dong-woo and Kim "Candy" Seung-ju joined as the team's jungler and mid laner respectively, whilst the bot lane duo of Wong "Unified" Chun-kit and Ling "Kaiwing" Kai-wing was acquired from Hong Kong Attitude.

2020 season 

Talon Esports finished third in the spring regular season, qualifying for the first round of playoffs in the winners' bracket. After sweeping Nova Esports in the first round, Talon Esports went on to reverse sweep ahq eSports Club in the second. This qualified them for the semifinals match in the winners' bracket, which they lost to Machi Esports in another close series. This forced Talon Esports to play in the semifinal match in the losers' bracket for another chance at qualifying for the finals, which they did after narrowly defeating ahq once again. Talon Esports managed to win their rematch with Machi Esports in the finals, winning their first title in their inaugural split.

Talon Esports announced on 18 June 2020 that its League of Legends team had partnered with PSG Esports and would henceforth compete as PSG Talon. Mid laner Park "Tank" Dan-won was brought in as a substitute for the summer split, but was later promoted to the starting position after the departure of Candy on 9 July 2020.

In a repeat of the spring split, PSG Talon finished third in the summer regular season, swept Nova Esports in the first round of the winners' bracket, and defeated ahq eSports Club in the second. PSG Talon managed to defeat Machi Esports in a close semifinals rematch, qualifying the team for the summer finals and the 2020 World Championship. PSG Talon later faced Machi Esports once again in a rematch of the spring finals; however, this time Machi Esports swept PSG Talon, forcing PSG Talon to start in the play-in stage of Worlds as the PCS' second seed.

During the 2020 Worlds Group Draw Show, it was revealed that River and Tank would be unable to attend the play-in stage due to delayed visas, and that Hsiao "Kongyue" Jen-tso and Chen "Uniboy" Chang-chu would be loaned from ahq eSports Club to replace them. The organisation confirmed this in an official announcement the next day, and further stated that Unified would also be unable to participate in the first half of the play-in stage for the same reason. Chen "Dee" Chun-dee was loaned from Machi Esports to replace Unified.

Despite starting the play-in stage with three emergency substitutes, PSG Talon won both their games on the first day of competition, including an upset victory over group favourites LGD Gaming. PSG Talon later topped their group after winning a tiebreaker match against the Unicorns of Love, qualifying the team for the tournament's main event. PSG Talon was placed in Group B for the main event, along with South Korea's DAMWON Gaming, China's JD Gaming, and Europe's Rogue. PSG Talon finished third in their group with a 2–4 win–loss record, ending their Worlds run.

PSG Talon announced the departure of Tank on 31 October 2021 and the signing of Huang "Maple" Yi-tang as his replacement on 10 December.

2021 season 

PSG Talon finished first in the spring regular season, losing only a single game to second-place Beyond Gaming. The team's regular season placement earned them a playoff bye to the second round of the winners' bracket, where they swept J Team. In the semifinals of the winners' bracket, PSG Talon swept Beyond Gaming and qualified for their third consecutive PCS finals. There, PSG Talon swept Beyond Gaming again, winning their second PCS title and qualifying for the 2021 Mid-Season Invitational (MSI 2021).

PSG Talon announced on 25 April 2021 that Unified would not participate in the 2021 Mid-Season Invitational due to recurring cases of pneumothorax. Beyond Gaming's owner, Xue "Dinter" Hong-wei, personally reached out to PSG Talon prior to the announcement and offered to loan out his team's bot laner, Chiu "Doggo" Tzu-chuan, for the duration of the tournament. This temporary transfer was subsequently approved by Riot Games.

For the group stage of MSI 2021, PSG Talon was placed in Group B, along with Europe's MAD Lions, Brazil's paiN Gaming, and Turkey's Istanbul Wildcats. PSG Talon finished second in their group with a 4–2 win–loss record, only losing to first-place MAD Lions, and qualified for the "rumble" stage of the tournament. PSG Talon finished third out of six teams in the rumble stage, advancing to the knockout stage. In the semifinals, China's Royal Never Give Up eliminated PSG Talon from the tournament after a four-game series.

Repeating their successes in the spring split, PSG Talon placed first in the summer regular season, finishing undefeated, and swept J Team in the second round of the winners' bracket. However, PSG Talon's winning streak was ended by Beyond Gaming which, after a close series, knocked PSG Talon down to the semifinals of the losers' bracket. After sweeping J Team once again, PSG Talon qualified for the 2021 World Championship and their fourth consecutive PCS finals, where they defeated Beyond Gaming after another close series.

PSG Talon's first-place finish in the summer split qualified them for the main event of the 2021 World Championship. The team was placed in Group C, along with China's Royal Never Give Up, South Korea's Hanwha Life Esports, and Europe's Fnatic. PSG Talon finished third in their group and failed to qualify for the knockout stage.

River left PSG Talon in November to play for LCS team Dignitas, while Maple left the following month to play for LPL team Anyone's Legend. They were replaced by Lee "Juhan" Ju-han and Park "Bay" Jun-byeong, respectively. Both were acquired from South Korean team Nongshim RedForce Challengers. PSG Talon also signed top laner Huang "Azhi" Shang-chih and mid laner Jason "Pretender" Ng Cheuk-lun as substitute players, although the latter was loaned out to Frank Esports shortly after joining the team.

2022 season 

PSG Talon finished first in the spring regular season, qualifying them for the second round of the winners' bracket of playoffs. After sweeping newcomers Deep Cross Gaming, PSG Talon advanced to the winners' bracket semifinals, where they lost to CTBC Flying Oyster, which consisted of several ex-Machi and ex-J Team players. PSG Talon managed to defeat J Team after a close series in the losers' bracket semifinals and advanced to their fifth consecutive PCS finals. Avoiding the mistakes of their last series against CTBC Flying Oyster, PSG Talon narrowly won the last game to claim their fourth PCS title and qualify for the 2022 Mid-Season Invitational (MSI 2022).

For the group stage of MSI 2022, PSG Talon was again placed in Group B, along with China's Royal Never Give Up, Brazil's Red Canids, and Turkey's Istanbul Wildcats. PSG Talon finished second in their group with a 3–3 win–loss record and advance to the rumble stage. There, PSG Talon finished fifth out of six teams and were eliminated from the tournament.

Following their disappointing showing at MSI 2022, PSG Talon announced on 1 June 2022 that Juhan and Bay had parted ways with the team. They were replaced by South Korean players Jeong "Burry" Seung-hwan and Kim "Gori" Tae-woo, respectively. Gori had previously played for South Korea's Nongshim RedForce and China's FunPlus Phoenix, and is most well-known for his time in the former. Analysts noted that Burry was an unknown rookie at the time of his signing, having only played in South Korea's semi-professional scene.

PSG Talon once again finished first in the summer regular season and qualified for the second round of the winners' bracket of playoffs. After narrowly losing to CTBC Flying Oyster in the second round of the winners' bracket, PSG Talon dropped to the second round of the losers' bracket, where they swept J Team. After a convincing victory over Deep Cross Gaming in the third round, PSG Talon was narrowly eliminated from the summer playoffs by Beyond Gaming in the losers' bracket semifinals. This marked the first time PSG Talon missed a PCS finals and, consequently, a World Championship.

Current roster

Tournament results

References

External links 
 

2020 establishments in Hong Kong
Esports teams established in 2020
Esports teams based in Hong Kong
Pacific Championship Series teams